Phra Nakhon Si Ayutthaya is the capital district (amphoe Mueang) of Phra Nakhon Si Ayutthaya province, central Thailand. Its former name as the capital city of Ayutthaya Kingdom was "Krungthep Thawarawadi Si Ayutthaya".

History
According to George Coedes, tradition states Ramathibodi I founded Dvaravati Sri Ayudhya in 1350.

Created in 1897, the district was originally called Rop Krung (รอบกรุง). The district name was changed to Krung Kao (กรุงเก่า) in 1917. In 1957 the name was changed to Phra Nakhon Si Ayutthaya. to commemorate the old capital city of the Ayutthaya Kingdom. This makes it unique among Thailand's capital districts, the rest of which are named amphoe mueang followed by the name of province.

Geography
Neighboring districts are (from the north clockwise) Bang Pahan, Nakhon Luang, Uthai, Bang Pa-in, Bang Sai and Bang Ban.

Administration
The district is divided into 21 sub-districts (tambon). In addition to the city (thesaban nakhon) of Ayutthaya there are other municipal areas. Ayothaya is a town (thesaban mueang) which covers part of the tambons Phai Ling, Hantra, and Khlong Suan Phlu.

References

External links
amphoe.com

Phra Nakhon Si Ayutthaya